The Leader of Government Business in the South Australian House of Assembly, commonly known as Leader of the House, is responsible for the management of government business in the lower house of the Parliament of South Australia. The office is held by a member of the Cabinet of South Australia.

The Leader of Government Business, also known as Manager of Government Business, is responsible for managing and scheduling government business including:
 the order in which government issues are to be dealt with
 tactical matters in reaction to impediments to such management
 negotiation with their opposition counterpart (the Manager of Opposition Business) about the order in which bills are to be debated, and
 time allotted for debate.

List of government business leaders

See also
 Leader of Government Business in the Legislative Council (South Australia)
 Leader of Government Business (disambiguation)
 Cabinet of South Australia
 Government of South Australia

References

Parliament of South Australia